Prince Stanisław Albrecht "Stash" Radziwiłł (21 July 1914 – 27 July 1976) was a Polish diplomat, chargé d'affaires of the Polish government in exile at the League of Nations, delegate of the Polish Red Cross, real estate dealer, director of Olympic Airways.

His parents were Janusz Franciszek, Prince Radziwiłł (1880–1967) and Anna Lubomirska (1882–1947). Stanisław had two elder brothers, Edmund Radziwiłł (1906–1971) and Ludwik Radziwiłł (1911–1928).

Marriages
Radziwiłł married Rose de Mauléon (1913–1996), on 10 April 1940, former niece-in-law of Irina Ovtchinnikova, wife of Prince Peter of Greece and Denmark. They had no children and their marriage was annulled in 1945. She later married Baron de Chollet, a Swiss banker.

Radziwill married Grace Maria Kolin on 2 May 1946. They were divorced in 1958. The marriage produced one son: 
John Stanislaw Radziwill (8 August 1947), who married Eugenia Carras on 14 September 1978. They have two sons and four grandchildren:
John Michael Radziwill (29 August 1979)
Philip Radziwill (4 February 1981), who married Devon Schuster on 16 January 2010. They have four children:
Eugenie Elizabeth Radziwill (24 October 2012)
Isabella Sophia Radziwill (17 July 2014)
Arietta Grace Radziwill (17 July 2014)
Stanislaw Radziwill (2018)

Grace Maria Kolin later married William Ward, 3rd Earl of Dudley (1894–1969) as his third wife, and from 1975, she lived with Robert B. Silvers.

Radziwiłł married Caroline Lee Bouvier Canfield on 19 March 1959. They had two children:
Anthony Radziwiłł (4 August 1959 – 10 August 1999), who married Carole Ann DiFalco on 27 August 1994. 
Anna Christina "Tina" Radziwill (18 August 1960), who married Octavio Arancio in September 1999 and they were divorced in 2005.

Later life
Radziwiłł was one of the organisers of the Sikorski Historical Institute in London and founder of St. Anne's Church at Fawley Court, the site of Divine Mercy College, a school for boys of Polish origin, set up by the Marian Fathers in 1953 near Henley-on-Thames, England.

He died on 27 July 1976, in London, six days after his 62nd birthday. His body was interred in the crypt of St Anne's Church at Fawley Court.

Title
According to Debrett's although known as Prince Radziwiłł in Britain, on becoming a British subject and in keeping with standard practice, Radziwiłł strictly needed permission from Queen Elizabeth II to use his princely title. The Radziwiłł family held the title of honorary Princes of the Holy Roman Empire since the early 16th century. However, noble titles were abolished in Poland and Austria.

Ancestry

See also
 Sikorski Museum

References

1914 births
1976 deaths
20th-century nobility
Bouvier family
People from London
People from Rivne
Polish princes
Polish Roman Catholics
Stanislaw
Polish emigrants to the United Kingdom